Soi is a surname. Notable people with the surname include:

 Brian Soi (born 1985), American football defensive tackle
 Edwin Soi (born 1986), Kenyan runner